Breaking Up with Shannen Doherty is an American reality television series on Oxygen Network. The series debuted on August 22, 2006.

Overview
In the series, actress Shannen Doherty joins forces with people in a relationship peril who want to get out but just can not seem to do it on their own. She listens to the plight of her new "client" and put their mates to the test by creating a fictitious situation - caught by a hidden camera - to determine the true character of the relationship. If the test is failed, Doherty then helps put the relationship out of its misery.

In each episode, Doherty helps mastermind the break-up, and be on the scene to deliver the news and resolve the break-up. The goal at the end is for both parties to agree that it's all for the best and it's time to move on.

Episodes

References

External links
 

2000s American reality television series
2006 American television series debuts
2006 American television series endings
English-language television shows
American dating and relationship reality television series
Oxygen (TV channel) original programming